José María Padilla Requena (4 December 1955 – 18 October 2020) was a Spanish disc jockey and producer of ambient music, best known for his work as DJ in the Café del Mar bar on the island of Ibiza.

Career
Born in Barcelona, Spain, Padilla moved to Ibiza in 1975, taking up the DJ residency at Café del Mar in 1991. In 1994, he compiled the first Cafe del Mar album for the React label. The series is now in its 25th volume and has spun off several related compilations, as well as leading to the creation of the bar's own eponymous label. Padilla selected tracks for the first six, as well as the 20th-anniversary commemorative release.

While several tracks of Padilla's appeared in his various compilations, it was not until 1998 that he released his first album, Souvenir, on Mercury Records label. The CD featured collaborations with several chill-out musicians, including Lenny Ibizarre and Paco Fernández. His second album, Navigator, was released in 2001. The album received a Latin Grammy nomination for Best Instrumental Album.

Padilla was no longer the resident DJ at Café del Mar, but toured around the world. However, in November 2007 a new compilation series called Bella Musica, unrelated to Café del Mar, was released.

In 2011, the new CD compilation "Here Comes the Sunset" (Volume 4) came out and after many years Padilla has been connected to another beach, this time in Italy, Fregene.

In 2015, Padilla made his new album So Many Colours available for streaming through Resident Advisor, before general release on International Feel.

Padilla returned to BBC Radio 1's Essential Mix decks in mid August 2015 for the first time in 20 years, with an eclectic two-hour "Masters" set.

Padilla revealed in July 2020 that he had been diagnosed with colorectal cancer at the age of 64.

Padilla died in Ibiza, Spain on 18 October 2020 at the age of 64, after a battle with colon cancer.

Discography
Below are the albums compiled in part by José Padilla:

References

External links
Jose Padilla - Home
José Padilla
Jose Padilla interview at PACHA NEWS
Blue Note Beach Classics

 

1955 births
2020 deaths
Musicians from Barcelona
Club DJs
Ambient musicians
Chill-out musicians
Deaths from cancer in Spain
Deaths from colorectal cancer